Where Does This Door Go is the third studio album by American singer Mayer Hawthorne. It was released on July 16, 2013, by Republic Records.

Singles
The album's lead single, "Her Favorite Song", was released on May 15, 2013, its music video was released on June 26, 2013.

Critical reception

Where Does This Door Go was met with generally positive reviews. At Metacritic, which assigns a normalized rating out of 100 to reviews from professional publications, the album received an average score of 73, based on 17 reviews. Aggregator AnyDecentMusic? gave it 6.9 out of 10, based on their assessment of the critical consensus.

Michael Gallucci of The A.V. Club stated, "For all of his apparent devotion to the genre, Hawthorne comes off somewhat soulless on Where Does This Door Go". Derek Staples of Consequence stated, "For those awaiting more of Hawthorne's soul revivalism, his new carefree mentality has also had a positive effect on the songwriter's more straightforward soul affairs". Ryan B. Patrick of Exclaim! stated, "With Where Does This Door Go, Hawthorne's falsetto-inflected voice has become more commanding, his production more intriguing and his indie-soul aspirations have morphed into mainstream ambitions". Andy Gill of The Independent stated, "Hawthorne's muse is steeped in '70 influences—notably falsetto and symphonic-soul giants like Curtis Mayfield and Barry White, while trailing threads of piercing lead guitar through songs like "Wine Glass Women" and "Corsican Rose" bring to mind Ernie Isley's work on "Summer Breeze". Zachary Houle of PopMatters stated, "Where Does This Door Go improves over his last effort, which was already pretty good to begin with, and may go down as one of the year's most exceptional releases. Where Does This Door Go is as refreshing as a tropical breeze, if not a good cup of joe at your favorite hangout".

Nate Patrin of Pitchfork stated, "Inconsistency or complexity? Depends on how much you believe in this music as sincere self-expression versus its status as smartly crafted, artist-as-listener-proxy pop". David Jeffries of AllMusic stated, "Wherever this door does go, it is a place that calls for boat shoes, a relaxed attitude, and a returning fan's patience". Harriet Gibsone of The Guardian stated, "Packed with cleverly crafted production, Where Does This Door Go may be a sonic adventure, but it's not quite slick enough to challenge the current crop of R&B luminaries". August Brown of Los Angeles Times stated, "Where Does This Door Go feels like a once-promising OK Cupid date that's gone off the rails". Mike Powell of Rolling Stone stated, "From modest goals come modest returns".

Commercial performance
Where Does This Door Go debuted at number 30 on the US Billboard 200, and number four on the R&B Albums, selling around 10,000 copies in its first week. It has sold 38,000 copies in the United States as of March 2016.

Track listing

Notes
 signifies a co-producer
 "Back Seat Lover" features background vocals by Da Internz, Fernanda Repsold, Jackson Perry, and JimiJames
 "The Innocent" features additional vocals by Jack Splash
 "Allie Jones" features background vocals by Oak and Steve Mostyn
 "Wine Glass Woman" features additional vocals by Jimetta Rose
 "Her Favorite Song" features additional vocals by Jessie Ware
 "Corsican Rosé" features additional vocals by Marsha Ambrosius
 "Robot Love" features additional vocals by Destiny Papalia
 "The Stars Are Ours" features additional vocals by Pharrell Williams
 "All Better" features additional vocals by Jackson Perry, Jeanette Boling, Josh Remsberg, and Shaili Sirpal
 "Fool" features background vocals by Jen Hirsh

Sample credits
 "Robot Love" contains an interpolation from "Put Your Love (In My Tender Care)", written by William Curtis.

Charts

References

Mayer Hawthorne albums
2013 albums
Republic Records albums
Albums produced by Greg Wells
Albums produced by Jack Splash
Albums produced by Jake One
Albums produced by Oak Felder
Albums produced by Pharrell Williams